Amphidromus asper is a species of large-sized air-breathing tree snail, an arboreal gastropod mollusk in the family Camaenidae.

Morphology 
This species has large-sized swollen yellow-brown shell with black zigzag lines.

Distribution 
Đắk Lắk Province, Central Vietnam.

References 

asper
Gastropods described in 1934